Wells County is the name of two counties in the United States:

 Wells County, Indiana
 Wells County, North Dakota